Ramat Aharon is a neighbourhood in the eastern part of Bnei Brak, Israel.

The neighbourhood was established in 1967 and was named after Rabbi Aharon Kotler.

The streets of the neighbourhood are lined with buildings that house large institutions of Torah and chesed, which give the neighbourhood its unique character.

The Av Beit Din of Ramat Aharon is Rabbi Nissim Karelitz.

References

Bnei Brak
Neighborhoods in Israel